Adam McBurney (born 5 September 1996) is an Irish rugby union player, currently playing for United Rugby Championship side Edinburgh Rugby. He plays as a hooker.

He started playing with Randalstown RFC at about eight years old, and was named Youth Player of the Season in the 2014 Ulster Rugby Awards. He was selected for the Ulster under-18 team, and from there was selected for Ireland at under-18 and under-20 level, appearing at the 2016 Under-20 World Championship. He played club rugby for Ballymena R.F.C. in the All-Ireland League. He joined the Ulster academy ahead of the 2016–17 season. He made his senior debut for Ulster on 30 September 2017 in round 5 of the 2017–18 Pro14, featuring off the bench in the provinces 27–23 loss against Italian side Zebre. He played four seasons with Ulster, vying with John Andrew for the second-choice hooker spot behind Rob Herring.

McBurney, who is Scottish-qualified through his grandmother, signed with Edinburgh in March 2021.

References

External links
Edinburgh Rugby Profile
United Rugby Championship Profile

1996 births
Living people
Irish rugby union players
Ulster Rugby players
Rugby union hookers
Edinburgh Rugby players
Rugby union players from Ballymena
People from Northern Ireland of Scottish descent